Mikhail Babushkin (October 6, 1893 – May 18, 1938) was a Soviet polar aviator and a Hero of the Soviet Union (June 27, 1937). Together with Mikhail Vodopyanov, he was the first to land an airplane on the North Pole.

Biography 

Mikhail Babushkin was born in a village of Bordino (which was merged into the city of Moscow in 1960), started military service in 1914, graduated from Gatchina aviation school (one of the first Russian aviation schools) in 1915. Since 1923 he served in the Arctic aviation. He took part in an expedition to rescue Umberto Nobile in 1928, and in the Chelyuskin expedition in 1933. He took part in the flights to the Soviet drifting ice station "North Pole-1" in 1937. Between 1937 and 1938, Mikhail Babushkin participated in a search for Sigizmund Levanevsky. He died in 1938 in a flight accident and was interred at the Novodevichy Cemetery.

Mikhail Babushkin was also a recipient of the Order of Lenin. A district of Moscow (in the area where he was born) and the Babushkinskaya station of the Moscow Metro are named after him.

References 

Heroes of the Soviet Union
Soviet polar explorers
Russian explorers
Burials at Novodevichy Cemetery
1893 births
1938 deaths
Recipients of the Order of the Red Banner
Recipients of the Order of Lenin
Victims of aviation accidents or incidents in the Soviet Union